Agra solisi is a species of carabid beetle. The holotype was collected in Costa Rica and first described to science in 2002 by Terry L. Erwin.

References 

Lebiinae
Beetles described in 2002